David M. Delloso (born June 18, 1965) is a Democratic member of the Pennsylvania House of Representatives. He has represented the 162nd district since 2019.

Biography
After graduating from Academy Park High School, Delloso attended Mansfield University of Pennsylvania. He was in the USML Reserve from 1984 to 1990 and 1991 to 1993. He was president of the Teamsters Local 312.

Delloso defeated Mary Hopper in the 162nd district in 2018, receiving 12,826 votes. The seat became open after Nicholas Miccarelli III declined to run due to rape allegations. 

In October 2019, Delloso introduced House Bill 1899, which would make cannabis accessible at state-run liquor stores.

He is married to his wife Susan.

References

Living people
Democratic Party members of the Pennsylvania House of Representatives
1965 births
Mansfield University of Pennsylvania alumni
People from Darby, Pennsylvania
21st-century American politicians